OJK may refer to:
 Estonian Safety Investigation Bureau
 Financial Services Authority (Indonesia)